= 武州 =

武州 may refer to:

- Gwangju, historically recorded as Muju (무주; 武州), a metropolis city in South Korea
- Musashi Province, abbreviated name was Bushū (武州), province of Japan located in what is today Tokyo Metropolis, most of Saitama Prefecture and part of Kanagawa Prefecture
